Nemotarsus is a genus of beetles in the family Carabidae, containing the following species:

 Nemotarsus disciger (Chaudoir, 1876) 
 Nemotarsus elegans Leconte, 1853 
 Nemotarsus fallax (Dejean, 1831) 
 Nemotarsus interruptus (Chaudoir, 1876) 
 Nemotarsus limbicollis Bates, 1883 
 Nemotarsus rhombifer Bates, 1883 
 Nemotarsus scutellaris (Chaudoir, 1876) 
 Nemotarsus sellatus (Emden, 1958) 
 Nemotarsus titschacki (Liebke, 1951)

References

Lebiinae